Pam Shriver and Natasha Zvereva were the defending champions for the women's doubles. In 1992, they competed with different partners, Shriver with Martina Navratilova and Zvereva with Gigi Fernández.

Navratilova and Shriver lost in the semifinals to Jana Novotná and Larisa Savchenko-Neiland.

Fernández and Zvereva won in the final 7–6(7–4), 6–1 against Novotná and Savchenko-Neiland.

Seeds 
Champion seeds are indicated in bold text while text in italics indicates the round in which those seeds were eliminated.

Draw

Finals

Top half

Section 1

Section 2

Bottom half

Section 3

Section 4

External links 
1992 US Open – Women's draws and results at the International Tennis Federation

Women's Doubles
US Open (tennis) by year – Women's doubles
1992 in women's tennis
1992 in American women's sports